Sir Peter Manwood (1571–1625) was an English politician who sat in the House of Commons  at various times between 1589 and 1621.

Biography
Manwood was the eldest son of Sir Roger Manwood of Hackington and his first wife Dorothy Theobald, daughter of John Theobald of Seal. He was admitted as a student at Inner Temple on 20 November 1583. In 1589, he was elected Member of Parliament for Sandwich. He was commissioner for Dover haven by 1591. He succeeded to the estates of his father in 1592 and was a justice of the peace for Kent, serving in the court of quarter sessions from 1593 to 1620. In 1593, he was re-elected MP for Sandwich. He was commissioner for grain in 1596 and commissioner for musters by 1597. In 1597 he was re-elected MP for Sandwich. He travelled abroad in 1598 to increase his knowledge and learning as he tended towards more scholastic interests, and became a member of the Antiquarian Society. He was never called to the bar.

In 1601 Manwood was re-elected MP for Sandwich. He was knighted in 1603. In 1604 he was elected MP for Saltash. He was MP for Kent in 1614 and was elected MP for Romney in 1621. He had to go abroad because he was heavily in debt, but after making arrangements with hs creditors he returned by the end of 1623.

Manwood died in 1625.

Family
Manwood married  Frances Hart, daughter of Sir George Hart of Lullingstone in January 1588 and had at least seven sons and four daughters. His son John revived the family fortunes. One of his daughters, Elizabeth, married Thomas Walsingham.

References

 
 

1571 births
1625 deaths
English MPs 1589
English MPs 1593
English MPs 1597–1598
English MPs 1601
Members of the pre-1707 English Parliament for constituencies in Cornwall
English MPs 1604–1611
English MPs 1614
English MPs 1621–1622
High Sheriffs of Kent
Deputy Lieutenants of Kent